The 1996 NCAA Division I Men's Soccer Tournament was the 37th organized men's college soccer tournament by the National Collegiate Athletic Association, to determine the top college soccer team in the United States. The St. John's Red Storm won their first national title by defeating the Florida International Panthers in the championship game, 4–1. The final match was played on December 15, 1996, in Richmond, Virginia, at Richmond Stadium for the second straight year. All the other matches were played at the home field of the higher seeded team.

National Seeds

Early rounds

Final

References

NCAA Division I Men's Soccer Tournament seasons
NCAA Division I Men's
NCAA Division I Men's Soccer
NCAA Division I Men's Soccer Tournament